André Sainte-Laguë (20 April 1882 – 18 January 1950) was a French mathematician who was a pioneer in the area of graph theory.
His research on seat allocation methods (published in 1910) led to one being named after him, the Sainte-Laguë method. Also named after him is the Sainte-Laguë Index for measuring the proportionality of an electoral outcome.

He is also notable for his informal calculation that supposedly demonstrated that a bumblebee could not fly, referred to in the introduction of 'Le Vol des Insectes' (Hermann and Cle, Paris, 1934) by the entomologist Antoine Magnan. This casual calculation was based on a comparison between an aeroplane and a bee, making the wrong assumption that bees' wings were smooth and flat. He, and others, soon corrected this assumption, but the story of the scientist who demonstrated that bee flight was impossible persists to this day.

He published several popular math texts, including "From the known to the unknown" (foreword by biologist Jean Rostand) which has been translated into several languages.

Biography

Born in Casteljaloux (Lot-et-Garonne) in 1882, Sainte-Lague was admitted at once, at the age of 20 years at the Ecole Polytechnique and Ecole Normale Superieure. He chose the latter and became a professor in the provinces, then in Paris. During World War I, having been wounded three times, he was attached to the Department of Inventions of the Normal School from 1917 to 1919, studied long-range artillery shells, and thereafter, the flight of birds and matters relating to aviation (theory test fish).

After the First World War, as a professor in the schools of Paris, he became a lecturer in mathematics at the Conservatoire National des Arts et Metiers. Then he received in 1938, the Chair of Applied Mathematics. He trained generations of engineers and technicians. He was the organizer and host of the Mathematics Section of the Palace of Discovery, where his encyclopedic mind is still present.

Besides his academic career, he led a life of an activist, especially the Confederation of Intellectual Workers, of which he was president in 1929. From the earliest days of the occupation, he took an important part in the resistance and was even imprisoned for a while. He resumed his duties at the Conservatoire National des Arts et Metiers after the Liberation and had a growing number of students. At his death he was teaching three courses totaling two thousand five hundred students.

Officer of the Legion of Honour, Croix de Guerre and Medal of the Resistance, a professor at the School of Special Public Works, chairman of the International Confederation Intellectual of Workers, Vice-President of the Confederation of the Middle Class, former president of the Society of Fellows, former vice-president of National Economic Council, former member of the General Council of the Banque de France, former Deputy Provisional Consultative Assembly.(...)

His sudden death came at the very moment he had just accepted the chairmanship of the Committee of the League of Friends of the Psychic Institute, where he was vice president in 1949 and member since 1934. "(R. Warcollier, Vice- President of IMI, January–February–March 1950)

References

1882 births
1950 deaths
French mathematicians
Graph theorists
École Normale Supérieure alumni